Padar, also known as Pada, is a small island located between Komodo and Rinca islands within Komodo archipelago, administrated under the West Manggarai Regency, East Nusa Tenggara, Indonesia. It is the third largest island part of Komodo National Park. 

However, unlike neighboring islands of Komodo and Rinca that are teeming with the ferocious lizards, on Padar island the Komodo dragon was considered extinct. As of 2004 the Komodo Survival Agency has reported at least 12 individuals including one hatchling Komodo Dragon, showing that the dragons hold on the island of Padar is not over yet.

The topography of the island is rugged, with steep volcanic mountains and hills set against deep bays. Padar has a dry climate, with only bushes and grassland vegetation covering the island, creating savanna hills. Padar island has four deep bays with beaches in different colors. Most of them are white sands, while some beaches have grey and pink sands. The sea surrounding the island has several sites popular for scuba diving and snorkelling.

Gallery

References

Lesser Sunda Islands
Landforms of East Nusa Tenggara
Komodo National Park
Islands of Indonesia